Acoustic Verses is the fifth full-length studio album by the Norwegian progressive metal band Green Carnation. It was released on January 30, 2006 via Sublife Productions.

The album features three songs included on their 2005 EP The Burden Is Mine... Alone: "Sweet Leaf", "The Burden Is Mine... Alone", as well as the cover of Jon English's 1978 international hit "Six Ribbons" (only in the special edition).

Reception 

The album was met with positive reviews Blabbermouth.net rated it
with an 8 and describes it as "it's as lush, orchestrated, and enigmatic as any 'electric' album from this quizzical band".

Laura Taylor of Exclaim! said "similar to Opeth’s Damnation in some respects, Acoustic Verses covers more ground, perhaps in part because of the number of songwriters involved, but the album’s stylistic experimentation is very much in line with the Green Carnation’s proven pattern".

Background
Acoustic Verses was yet another stylistic shift for Green Carnation. On the album, as the name suggests, the band played all acoustic instruments, showing off a softer, warmer style for the band while retaining the progressive and darker feels they established since their debut.

Thus, Acoustic Verses represents an important and only change with respect to the previous works of the group, and in which practically all their members participated in its composition.

Track listing 

 *Note
Track 5 is split up into 3 different parts :
  “My Greater Cause”
 “Homecoming”
  “House of Cards”

Personnel
Green Carnation
 Kjetil Nordhus – vocals 
 Terje Vik Schei (a.k.a. Tchort) – guitars
 Michael Smith Krumins  – guitars 
 Stein Roger Sordal – bass guitar, guitars 
 Kenneth Silden – keyboards 
 Tommy Jacksonville – drums
 Bjørn "Berserk" Harstad – guitars

Guest musicians
 Bernt Moen – cello
Leif Wiese –	violin
Gustav Ekeberg – viola

Recording information 
Engineered and mixed at Brown Sound Studios, except track 4, mixed at Jailhouse Studios.
Violins, viola and cello recorded at Jailhouse Studios.
Drums recorded at Dub Studios.
Mastered at Lynor
Artwork by Jon Tønnessen

References

External links
Allmusic album review

Green Carnation albums
2006 albums